These are the official results of the Men's 200 metres event at the 1986 European Championships in Stuttgart, West Germany, held at Neckarstadion on 28 and 29 August 1986.

Medalists

Results

Final
29 August
Wind: 0.0 m/s

Semi-finals
28 August

Semi-final 1
Wind: 0 m/s

Semi-final 2
Wind: 0 m/s

Heats
28 August

Heat 1
Wind: -0.9 m/s

Heat 2
Wind: -1.7 m/s

Heat 3
Wind: -0.3 m/s

Heat 4
Wind: -0.5 m/s

Participation
According to an unofficial count, 25 athletes from 13 countries participated in the event.

 (1)
 (2)
 (3)
 (2)
 (1)
 (2)
 (1)
 (1)
 (3)
 (3)
 (1)
 (3)
 (2)

See also
 1984 Men's Olympic 200 metres (Los Angeles)
 1987 Men's World Championships 200 metres (Rome)
 1988 Men's Olympic 200 metres (Seoul)
 1990 Men's European Championships 200 metres (Split)

References

 Results

200
200 metres at the European Athletics Championships